Christmasville, Tennessee may refer to the following places in Tennessee:
Christmasville, Carroll County, Tennessee
Christmasville, Haywood County, Tennessee